Clemencia is used as a given name and a surname. People with the name include:

Given name
Clemencia López (c. 1876–1963), Filipina activist 
Clemencia Rodriguez, Colombian US-based media and communication scholar

Middle name
María Clemencia Rodríguez Múnera (born 1955), Colombian graphic designer
Maria Clemencia Colón Sánchez (1926–1989), Puerto Rican American politician

Surname
Joceline Clemencia (1952–2011), Afro-Curaçaoan writer and linguist

See also
 Clemencia (disambiguation)

Feminine given names
Latin-language surnames